Signora is the Italian-language version of Mrs; it may also refer to:

Entertainment
L'ha fatto una signora, a 1938 film directed by Mario Mattoli and starring Michele Abruzzo;
La Signora, a character in Commedia dell'arte;
Signora Bovary, an album of Italian singer-songwriter Francesco Guccini;
La signora delle camelie, a 1915 Italian historical drama film;
La signora senza camelie, a 1953 Italian black-and-white drama film;
La Signora (Chinese: 女士), a character in Genshin Impact.

Religion
Nostra Signora, the Italian religious title for the Blessed Virgin Mary;
Signora Oriente, the name of an alleged religious figure.